Farmington Township is one of the twenty-four townships of Trumbull County, Ohio, United States. The 2000 census recorded 2,353 people in the township, 1,834 of whom lived in the unincorporated portions of the township.

Geography
Located in the northwestern part of the county, it borders the following townships:
Mesopotamia Township - north
Bloomfield Township - northeast corner
Bristol Township - east
Champion Township - southeast corner
Southington Township - south
Nelson Township, Portage County - southwest corner
Parkman Township, Geauga County - west
Middlefield Township, Geauga County - northwest corner

The village of West Farmington is located in northwestern Farmington Township.

Name and history
It is the only Farmington Township statewide.

Education
School-age children from Farmington and Bristol townships attend the Bristol school system in Bristolville.

Government
The township is governed by a three-member board of trustees, who are elected in November of odd-numbered years to a four-year term beginning on the following January 1. Two are elected in the year after the presidential election and one is elected in the year before it. There is also an elected township fiscal officer, who serves a four-year term beginning on 1 April f the year after the election, which is held in November of the year before the presidential election. Vacancies in the fiscal officership or on the board of trustees are filled by the remaining trustees.

References

External links
County website

Townships in Trumbull County, Ohio
Townships in Ohio